David Duncan (28 February 1789 – 27 August 1829) was a British minister in the Presbyterian United Secession Church.

Life
Born in Forgandenny, Perthshire, Scotland, fourth son of Lilias and Gilbert Duncan. He was educated at the University of Edinburgh, studied Latin, Greek, logic, mathematics, moral and natural philosophy. In 1817 he was admitted a student into the Divinity Hall, under the inspection of the General Associate Synod of the Presbyterian Secession Church: the Rev. George Paxton, of Edinburgh, was professor. In 1822, he took the ministerial care of the United Associate Congregation of Union Chapel in Sunderland, Durham until he died after suffering from an infection.

David Duncan was interred in a vault immediately below the pulpit of Union Chapel, Coronation Street, Sunderland.

References 

1789 births
1829 deaths
People from Perthshire
Infectious disease deaths in England
Alumni of the University of Edinburgh
Ministers of Secession Churches in Scotland